Beer production in Australia has traditionally been dominated by regional producers. Since the 1980s, there have been a steady stream of takeovers and amalgamations, and now the two major producers (who were once Australian-owned) are Carlton & United Breweries (CUB) and Lion.

In December 2011, CUB became a subsidiary of British multinational SABMiller (the world's then-second-largest international brewing company) and in October 2016 CUB became 100% owned by Anheuser-Busch InBev (AB InBev) the world's largest brewing company, based in Belgium. AB InBev then sold CUB to Japanese company Asahi Breweries on 1 June 2020.

Since October 2009, Lion has been a subsidiary of Japanese brewer, Kirin Holdings Company Limited a brewing company established in 1885. The largest remaining Australian owned brewer is Coopers Brewery with a market share of about 4% of total beer volume sales in Australia.

The two foreign-owned companies accounted for 89% of beer volume sales in 2011, with CUB's market share at 48% (declining from a 55% market share in 2006) and Lion at 41% (increasing from 37%).

In May 2012 the dominant Australian-produced beers were XXXX Gold, which accounted for 12.4% of all beer consumed in Australia, VB, with 12.3%, Carlton Draught 9.3%, Tooheys New 7.1%, Tooheys Extra Dry 4.4% and Carlton Mid 3.8%.

Breweries owned by major companies

Microbreweries

A microbrewery, or craft brewery, is a modern brewery which produces a limited amount of beer, usually with an orientation toward distinctive and flavourful products. In Australia, there is no strict definition for a microbrewery; however, the definition for membership of the Independent Brewers Association provides a fair guide that could be considered appropriate. That is, a brewer sells less than 40 million litres of beer per annum and is not more than 20% owned by a brewer that produces more than 40 million litres of beer per annum anywhere in the world.

The following is a list of notable microbreweries in Australia, listed alphabetically. In July 2017, there was approximately 500 small breweries in Australia.

See also

 Beer and breweries by region
 Endeavour Group

References

Sources

External links
craftbeerreviewer.com: Comprehensive list of current and former Breweries

Australia
Lists of companies of Australia
Australian cuisine-related lists